Switzerland is competing at the 2013 World Aquatics Championships in Barcelona, Spain between 19 July and 4 August 2013.

Open water swimming

Switzerland qualified a single quota in open water swimming.

Swimming

Swiss swimmers achieved qualifying standards in the following events (up to a maximum of 2 swimmers in each event at the A-standard entry time, and 1 at the B-standard):

Men

Synchronized swimming

Switzerland has qualified twelve synchronized swimmers.

References

External links
 Barcelona 2013 Official Site
 Swiss Swimming Federation 

Nations at the 2013 World Aquatics Championships
2013 in Swiss sport
Switzerland at the World Aquatics Championships